In medicine, natural causes are a manner of death when the death is attributable to illness or an internal malfunction of the body.

Natural causes may also refer to:
 Natural Causes, a 1972 album by Richard Landis
 Natural Causes (Skylar Grey album), 2016
 Natural Causes (1985 film), an Australian television movie which aired in 1986
 Natural Causes (1994 film), an action–drama thriller film
 Natural Causes (novel), a 1953 novel by Henry Cecil
 Natural Causes, a novel by Michael Palmer (novelist)
 Natural Causes, a book about the supplement industry by Dan Hurley (author)
 Natural Causes, a documentary about Andrew Lees (environmentalist)
 Natural Causes, the second album by Israeli alternative progressive rock band Solstice Coil

See also 
 Act of God, in insurance, an unpredictable or extreme act of nature caused without human intervention or agency